The  is a Japanese Buddhist lay organisation that stems from the Reiyūkai, a branch of Nichiren Buddhism. It was founded in 1951 and has approximately 219,000 adherents, most of whom are in Japan. The current president of Myōdōkai Kyōdan is Keiji Sahara. The organisation's headquarters are in Tennōji, Ōsaka. One of its core teachings is the belief in the Lotus Sutra.

References

Sources 
 妙道会教团 (Chinese)

External links 
 official website  (Japanese)

1951 establishments in Japan
Buddhist new religious movements
Japanese new religions
Nichiren Buddhism
Religious organizations based in Japan